Zenodorus metallescens is a species of ant-hunting jumping spider found in Papua New Guinea and Australia. The common name is cast-iron jumping spider as the white patterns on the abdomen resemble cast-iron designs in fences and gates.

Description
Zenodorus metallescens are black, with white markings on the carapace and abdomen. The legs are light brown with a white band on the femur of each leg. Females and males grow to  overall body length. The species is common in 
northern Queensland and recognisable with contrasting colours.

Gallery

References

Spiders of Australia
Spiders described in 1879
Salticidae